The 1919 Giro di Lombardia was the 15th edition of the Giro di Lombardia cycle race and was held on 2 November 1919. The race started and finished in Milan. The race was won by Costante Girardengo.

General classification

References

1919
Giro di Lombardia
Giro di Lombardia